Saer Sene may refer to:

Mouhamed Sene, Senegalese basketball player
Saër Sène, French footballer

See also
 Sene (disambiguation)